The winners of the 1999 Governor General's Literary Awards were announced by Jean-Louis Roux, chairman, and Shirley Thomson, director of the Canada Council for the Arts, at a press conference held on November 16 at the National Library of Canada.

English

French

References

Governor General's Awards
Governor General's Awards
Governor General's Awards